A Mersey flat is a type of doubled-ended barge, they were commonly used on the River Mersey.

Construction

Traditionally, the hull was built of oak and the deck was pitch pine. Some had a single mast, with a fore-and-aft rig, while some had an additional mizzen mast. Despite having a flat bottom and curved sides, they were quite stable. They were common from the 1730s to 1890s.

They could carry up to 80 tons of cargo, and this size allowed them to work along the Bridgewater Canal, the Sankey Canal and the northern parts of the Shropshire Union Canal.

Naming

As the name suggests, these flats originated on the River Mersey, but they were also used on the rivers Irwell and Weaver.

Usage

Most Mersey flats had been converted to dumb barges by the end of the 19th century, towed by horses or by steam tugs. The larger Weaver flats were fitted with steam engines, and later with diesel engines, although there were still around 20 working by sail in 1935. Both the Liverpool Maritime Museum and the Ellesmere Port Museum have a Mersey flat in their collections, neither of which actually worked under sail.

See also
Thames sailing barge

References

Barges
Sailing